The 1957–58 season was the Royals first season in Cincinnati, following its relocation from Rochester during the offseason. Interest in the team was created by a draft deal that brought Lakers All-Star Clyde Lovellette to the team. The team then lured guard George King, the former Syracuse starter back from college coaching. Both additions added talent and veteran leadership to a still young squad.

The roster included star shooter Jack Twyman, Dick Ricketts (who also pitched in the major leagues), and star swing man Tom Marshall. In their first year in Cincinnati, the Royals ended a two-year playoff drought by finishing in third place after tie-breakers in the NBA's West Division. The Royals finished with a record of 33–39. One of the team leaders was Maurice Stokes, who finished second in rebounding with 18.1 rebounds per game. The 6'8 240-pound Stokes, arguably the NBA's first black superstar, also amazed by rating third in the NBA in assists.

Lovellette was fourth in the NBA in scoring, while Twyman led the NBA in shooting accuracy. The entire frontline of Stokes, Lovellette and Twyman were named NBA All-Stars that first season. The team had the makings of a real contender, but the backcourt was debilitated by injuries to Marhsall and King, plus promising Si Green and Johnny McCarthy had been lost to mandatory military service. The team's first-year promise took a tragic turn in mid-March. In the final game of the regular season, played on March 12, Stokes suffered an injury when his head hit the hardwood floor in a game versus the Minneapolis Lakers. Despite being knocked unconscious, Stokes would play in the playoffs against the Detroit Pistons. On the flight home after losing to the Pistons, Stokes suddenly fell ill and was rushed to the hospital upon landing. As the Pistons swept the Royals, Stokes lapsed into a coma. It was revealed that Stokes suffered encephalopathy, a traumatic brain injury that damaged his motor control center. The injury would leave Maurice Stokes as a quadriplegic without the ability to speak. Teammate Jack Twyman would serve as Stokes legal guardian until his death in 1970.
The Stokes tragedy would ultimately decimate the team, with six other players not returning for next season. The team was also suddenly sold to local Cincinnati buyers, and coach Bobby Wanzer would also later be replaced. This first year, therefore, stands out from all the Cincinnati teams.

Draft picks

The Royals made the deal of the NBA draft with the first overall pick. They selected high-touted Rod Hundley, and then sent him along with two reserves to the Lakers for All-Star Clyde Lovellette and solid reserve Jim Paxson, who had been a college star at nearby Dayton.
The Royals then tried to shore up their backcourt with selections Dick Duckett( 2 ), Gerry Paulson( 3 ),John Maglio ( 6 ) and Chet Forte ( 7 ). Forte was later the Director of ABC's Monday Night Football.
As the season ended, local stars Oscar Robertson and Jerry Lucas were tabbed as territorial draft picks. Each would be selected by the team after the college senior seasons.

Regular season

Season standings

Record vs. opponents

Game log

The first Cincinnati Royals game ever was a home game against Syracuse, 26 October 1957, a 110–100 win behind local star Jack Twyman. The team opened to good crowds with home games in their first ten.
Nov 7–7, Dec 5–13 with injuries and extra road games, January 11–5, Feb 4–12 with a season-ending injury to Marshall, March 5–2, plus two playoff losses to Detroit, due to the permanent loss of Stokes.

Playoffs

|- align="center" bgcolor="#ffcccc"
| 1
| March 15
| @ Detroit
| L 83–100
| Clyde Lovellette (15)
| Detroit Olympia
| 0–1
|- align="center" bgcolor="#ffcccc"
| 2
| March 16
| Detroit
| L 104–124
| Jack Twyman (24)
| Cincinnati Gardens
| 0–2
|-

Player statistics

Season

Playoffs

Awards and honors
 Maurice Stokes, 2nd in rebounds, 3rd in assists, Second Team All-NBA.
 Clyde Lovellette, 1st in field goals made, 4th in scoring, 4th in shooting accuracy, Second Team All-NBA.
 Jack Twyman, 1st in shooting accuracy, NBA All-Star.
 George King, among top ten in NBA assists.

References

 Royals on Basketball Reference

Sacramento Kings seasons
Cincinnati
Cincinnati
Cincinnati